Statistics Canada divides the province of Alberta into nineteen census divisions. Unlike in some other provinces, census divisions do not reflect the organization of local government in Alberta. These areas exist solely for the purposes of statistical analysis and presentation; they have no government of their own.

Alberta's census divisions consist of numerous census subdivisions. The types of census subdivisions within an Alberta census division may include:
cities, towns, villages, and summer villages (urban municipalities); 
specialized municipalities;
municipal districts, special areas, and improvement districts (rural municipalities);
Indian reserves; and
Indian settlements.

List of census divisions 
The following is a list of Alberta's census divisions. Population, area, and density figures are from the 2016 Census.

See also 

List of cities in Alberta
List of communities in Alberta
List of designated places in Alberta
List of hamlets in Alberta
List of Indian reserves in Alberta
List of municipal districts in Alberta
List of municipalities in Alberta
List of population centres in Alberta
List of summer villages in Alberta
List of towns in Alberta
List of villages in Alberta
Specialized municipalities of Alberta
Subdivisions of Canada

References 

 
Census divisions